East Branch may refer to:

East Branch Delaware River, Delaware County, New York
East Branch Handsome Brook, Delaware County, New York
East Branch Township, Marion County, Kansas
East Branch (Newtown Creek), estuary between the boroughs of Brooklyn and Queens, in New York City

See also

 Branch (disambiguation)
 West Branch (disambiguation)
 North Branch (disambiguation)
 South Branch (disambiguation)